= Barstuk =

Polish mythical creature

Barstuk is a type of small dwarf in Warmian-Masurian folk tales. The creature inhabited forests and it is believed to have been helping people whose houses it secretly visited.
